The Mining Exchange is a Grade II listed building in Redruth, Cornwall, UK. It was constructed in 1880 at a cost of £500 to build. It is thought to have been designed by local architect Sampson Hill. The Mining Exchange was where local producers sold mineral stock.

References

History of mining in the United Kingdom
History of Cornwall
Mining in Cornwall
Organisations based in Cornwall
Grade II listed buildings in Cornwall
Commercial buildings completed in 1880
1880 establishments in the United Kingdom
Industrial archaeological sites in Cornwall
Redruth